Gaius Atilius Bulbus was a Roman statesman in the 3rd century BC. He served as consul twice, first in 245 with Marcus Fabius Buteo, then again in 235 alongside Titus Manlius Torquatus, who would later go on to become dictator in 208. Bulbus also served as censor in 234 alongside Aulus Postumius Albinus.

References

3rd-century BC Roman consuls
Bulbus, Gaius